Governor Thompson State Park is a  state park in Wisconsin, USA, in development approximately  northwest of Crivitz. Adjacent lands are part of the Peshtigo River State Forest. The park was created in 2000, the centennial year of the Wisconsin state park system, and named after then-Governor Tommy Thompson.

The park opened in 2005 for day use activities. In 2008, the park contained a headquarters,  of hiking trails, a boat landing (#13) on the Caldron Falls flowage, and a picnic area along the west shore of Woods Lake. Further amenities were being installed. Planned activities include a campground, indoor and outdoor group campgrounds, playground and an amphitheater.

Images

References

External links

Governor Thompson State Park official site

Protected areas of Marinette County, Wisconsin
State parks of Wisconsin
Protected areas established in 2000
2000 establishments in Wisconsin